Tarmo Koivuranta (born 15 April 1980, Kolari, Finland) is a Finnish footballer and plays for Finnish First Division club JIPPO Joensuu. He plays as midfielder.

Career
Koivuranta has made 79 appearances in the Veikkausliiga.

References

External links
Profile at Guardian's Stats Centre

1980 births
Living people
Finnish footballers
Veikkausliiga players
FC Haka players
AC Oulu players
JIPPO players
Association football midfielders